Bulange (boo-lah-ngeh), is a building in Uganda. It houses the Lukiiko (Parliament) of the Kingdom of Buganda. The Kabaka of Buganda and the Katikkiro (Prime Minister) of Buganda also maintain offices in the building. The building serves as the administrative headquarters of the Buganda Kingdom.

Location
The coordinates of Bulange are 0°18'35.0"N, 32°33'30.0"E (Latitude:0.309722; Longitude:32.558333).

History
In the beginning, the Buganda Parliament convened inside one of the Kabaka's palaces and conducted business under the shade of one or more trees. Later, grass-thatched buildings served as the parliament buildings. Around the beginning of the 20th century, Prime Minister of Buganda, Apollo Kaggwa, contracted  an Indian, Alidina Visram, to build a parliament building using bricks. As the kingdom's government grew in size, the need for a large-enough meeting hall forced the construction of the Bulange outside the King's Palace for the first time.

While in exile in Scotland in 1953, Ssekabaka Muteesa II saw and admired the construction drawings of a building. He brought those drawings with him on his return from exile in 1955. He directed that the new Bulange be constructed according to those drawings. Construction began in 1955 and was completed in 1958 at a cost of £5 million, fully funded by the Government of Buganda.

See also
 Mengo Hill
 Namirembe
 Lubaga Division
 Kampala Capital City Authority

References

External links
Photo of the Current Bulange at Cardcow.com
Background to the Construction of Bulange

Buganda
Government buildings completed in 1955
Buildings and structures in Kampala
1955 establishments in the British Empire